Earth observation satellites are earth-orbiting spacecraft with sensors used to collect imagery and measurements of the surface of the earth. These satellites are used to monitor short-term weather, long-term climate change, natural disasters. Earth observations satellites provide information for research subjects that benefit from looking at earth’s surface from above (such as meteorology, oceanography, terrestrial ecology, glaciology, atmospheric science, hydrology, geology, and many more). Types of sensors on these satellites include passive and active remote sensors. Sensors on earth observation satellites often take measurements of emitted energy over some portion of the electromagnetic spectrum (e.g., UV, visible, infrared, microwave, or radio). 

The invention of climate research through the use of satellite remote telemetry began in the 1960s through development of space probes to study other planets. During the U.S. economic decline in 1977, with much of NASA's money going toward the shuttle program, the Reagan Administration proposed to reduce spending on planetary exploration. During this time, new scientific evidence emerged from ice and sediment cores that Earth's climate had experienced rapid changes in temperature, running contrary to the previously held belief that the climate changed on a geological time scale.  These changes increased political interest in gathering remote-sensing data on the Earth itself and stimulated the science of climatology.

Classification
The lists below classify earth observation satellites in two large groups: satellites operated by government agencies of one or more countries (public domain) versus commercial satellites built and maintained by companies (private domain). These lists focus on currently active missions, rather than inactive retired missions or planned future missions. However, some examples of past and future satellites are included. Active, inactive, or planned classifications are relevant as of 2021.

Public domain or government agency satellites

Active government satellites

Inactive government satellites

Planned government satellites

Private or commercial satellites

Active commercial satellites

Inactive commercial satellites

Planned commercial satellites

See also

Committee on Earth Observation Satellites
Earth observation satellite
First images of Earth from space
Orbital spaceflight
Imaging satellites
Satellite
Satellite imagery
Timeline of Earth science satellites
Unmanned space mission

Related lists:
List of government space agencies
List of orbits
List of satellites in geosynchronous orbit
List of uncrewed spacecraft by program

Notes

References

Further reading

External links

 Committee on Earth Observation Satellites
 ESA Earth Observation Portal Satellite Missions Directory 
 World Meteorological Organization's Observing Systems Capability Analysis and Review Tool: List of all satellites

Lists of satellites
Earth sciences
Lists of spacecraft
Lists of artificial objects sent into space